Velodrome Station is a light rail station of the Jakarta LRT Line 1, located at Rawamangun, Pulo Gadung, East Jakarta. The station is one of the six stations of the first phase of Jakarta LRT Line 1 which opened on 1 December 2019.

Velodrome Station is located near Rawamangun sports complex, which include Jakarta International Velodrome (hence the name).

Services
  Line 1, to

References

East Jakarta
Jakarta LRT stations
Railway stations opened in 2019